Leigh Robert Hochberg is an American neurologist, neuroscientist, and neuroengineer. He is the Director of the Center for Neurotechnology and Neurorecovery at Massachusetts General Hospital and the L. Herbert Ballou University Professor of Engineering at Brown University. He is also affiliated with the VA RR&D Center for Neurorestoration and Neurotechnology. Hochberg is known with his involvement in BrainGate and brain-computer interface research more broadly. In 2021, he led a clinical trial demonstrating the first high-bandwidth wireless human brain-computer interface.

Hochberg earned his Bachelor of Science in neuroscience from Brown University in 1990. He completed his MD and Ph.D. at Emory University in 1999.

Awards and fellowships 

 Society for Neuroscience, Member
 American Academy of Neurology, Fellow
 American Neurological Association, Fellow

References

External links 

 
 Neurotree: Leigh Hochberg

Living people
Year of birth missing (living people)
Brown University alumni
Emory University alumni
Emory University School of Medicine alumni
Brown University faculty

American neuroscientists
American neurologists